Kristin Feireiss (born 1 July 1942) is a German architectural and design curator, writer, and editor. Her career has included co-founding the Aedes Architecture Forum in Berlin, serving as director of the Netherlands Architecture Institute, and participating as an international juror and commissioner at the Architecture Biennale in Venice. In 2013, Feireiss became a Pritzker Architecture Prize juror.

Early life and education
Feireiss was born in Berlin. She embarked on a course in Art History at Johann Wolfgang Goethe University in Frankfurt in 1963, and graduated from Freie Universität Berlin in 1967.

Career
In the late 1960s, Feireiss began working as a journalist for cultural magazines and radio programs. In 1980, she co-founded Aedes in Berlin, a forum for architecture. She has served in various capacities for a number of other organizations including Netherlands Architecture Institute (director; 1996–2001), Venice Biennale of Architecture (commissioner, Dutch Pavilion, 1996 and again in 2000; International Jury, 2012), Pritzker Architecture Prize (juror, 2015), and the European Cultural Parliament (since 2007). Feireiss is the author or co-author of various works, including Architecture in times of need: Make It Right rebuilding New Orleans’ Lower Ninth Ward, with Brad Pitt.

Honours
Feireiss was honored as a Knight of the Order of the Netherlands Lion (2013). On 26 October 2007, Kristin Feireiss received an honorary doctorate from the Carolo-Wilhelmina Technische Universität in Braunschweig. In awarding this degree, the TU Braunschweig paid tribute to Feireiss for her activities as a journalist, curator, and founder of the Aedes Architecture Forum (Berlin), and for serving for more than 25 years as a mediator between academic architectural research and an interdisciplinary, international public. In 2016 she was awarded the Honorary Fellowship by the Royal Institute of British Architects.

Selected works 
 Kristin Feireiss; Lukas Feireiss: Architecture of change: sustainability and humanity in the built environment. Die Gestalten, Berlin 2008, .
 Kristin Feireiss; Brad Pitt: Architecture in times of need: Make It Right rebuilding New Orleans’ Lower Ninth Ward. Prestel, München 2009, .
 Wie ein Haus aus Karten. Die Neckermanns – meine Familiengeschichte. Ullstein, Berlin 2012, .

References

1942 births
Living people
Journalists from Berlin
German non-fiction writers
German women writers
German curators
German editors
Goethe University Frankfurt alumni
Free University of Berlin alumni
Knights of the Order of the Netherlands Lion
Recipients of the Cross of the Order of Merit of the Federal Republic of Germany